MariaGroup is a multinational architecture and design firm led by principal architects Michèle Maria Chaya and Georges Maria. The firm was founded in 1999 in Beirut, Lebanon.

MariaGroup projects include high-end residential properties for private clients and real estate developers, flagship stores, internationally published restaurants, public buildings. Additionally, the firm has completed commissioned objects and installations.

Restaurant design 
MariaGroup was commissioned to redesign the interior and outdoor spaces of Beirut's iconic Centrale Restaurant in 2014. The restaurant was initially conceived by architect Bernard Khoury in 2001.

In 2017, the firm was credited with the internationally published interior design of Skirt steakhouse in the Beirut Central District.

Object and furniture design 
In 2014, MariaGroup participated in the House of Today Biennale which was themed "Naked, beyond the social mask". MariaGroup's contribution to the event was a custom designed table titled "Showdown", which included bright amber-colored, resin-cast weapon models, as well as a cast proverbial pen in the center, concealed underneath a sober black gunmetal top. The table was displayed in an installation atop a large mirror which reflected the unexpected underside of the table.

In 2016, the firm collaborated with Jan Kath to design the "Light" carpet for the charity event "One Carpet for Love" organized by Iwan Maktabi.

In 2017, MariaGroup created an installation for the annual "Art of Dining" event organized and published by Architectural Digest Middle East. The installation consisted of an organically shaped solid wood table covered in a thin layer of plaster in lieu of a tablecloth, molded white candle holders, high backed custom handmade rattan chairs, and a lighting suspension which included warm colored light filters and a mirror.

References 

Architecture firms of Lebanon
Lebanese companies established in 1999
Companies based in Beirut
Design companies established in 1999